The 2nd constituency of the Pas-de-Calais is a French legislative constituency in the Pas-de-Calais département.

Description

Pas-de-Calais' 2nd constituency was enlarged as a result of the 2010 redistricting of French legislative constituencies to include the entire of Arras having previously only contained the north of the city.
Politically Arras is famed for being the birthplace of revolutionary Maximilien de Robespierre.

The constituency is currently held by Jacqueline Maquet who had previously represented Pas-de-Calais' 1st constituency.

Historic Representatives

Election results

2022

 
 
 
 
 
 
 
 
 
|-
| colspan="8" bgcolor="#E9E9E9"|
|-

2017

2012

 
 
 
 
 
 
|-
| colspan="8" bgcolor="#E9E9E9"|
|-

2007

 
 
 
 
 
 
 
 
|-
| colspan="8" bgcolor="#E9E9E9"|
|-

2002

 
 
 
 
 
 
 
|-
| colspan="8" bgcolor="#E9E9E9"|
|-

1997

Sources
 Official results of French elections from 1998: 

2